El Puerto Records is a German music label that was founded in 2014 in Gerstetten near Ulm by Bernd Stelzer and Torsten Ihlenfeld. The main focus of the label is on rock / hard rock / heavy metal. In the beginning the distribution extends over Europe (Soulfood Music) and North America (Soulfood-Amped). In 2022, the distribution changed in favor of Edel Music and Kontor New Media.

History

The beginnings of El Puerto Records go back to 2011 when Stormwitch founder Harald Spengler (alias Lee Tarot) teamed up with co-founders Stefan Kauffmann (git) and Peter Langer (drums) to record new songs. After Spengler's death in 2013, the decision was made to continue Spengler's musical legacy under the name Witchbound. This also became the first release by El Puerto Records in 2015. This was followed in 2016 by the releases of "The Phans" (vintage rock) and Stepfather Fred (alternative rock), two bands from southern Germany, which the label noticed primarily because of their live qualities.

When Matt Bischof joined the promotion department, the label began to become increasingly international. With the American singer David Reece (ex-Accept) and his Sainted Sinners (including Frank Pané (Bonfire) and Ferdy Doernberg), another big name joined the label in 2016. In 2017, the European distribution of Beasto Blanco was taken over by Alice Cooper bassist Chuck Garric and Calico Cooper, the daughter of Alice Cooper. Souldrinker and Mystic Prophecy guitarist Markus Pohl made a debut in the same year. The increasing attention in the music scene led to larger and more experienced bands joining the label in 2018: Undertow and the German thrash metal band Necronomicon. With the Italians Alight and the Swiss Bloodlost, other bands joined. The year was rounded off by Mission in Black and Ginger Red. At the turn of the year 2019, Bodo Schopf (drummer from Michael Schenker and The Sweet) and David Readman (Pink Cream 69, Voodoo Circle, Almanac) joined Pendulum of Fortune and Dark Blue Inc. u. a. with Frank Pané (Bonfire), Göran Edman (Ex-Malmsteen), Hal Patino (Maryann Cotton, Ex-King Diamond and Ex-Pretty Maids). The latter came up with a guest appearance by Ian Paice (Deep Purple) on the debut CD. The orientation of the labels, both to oblige bands from the immediate region and to perform internationally, ensured that more international acts joined the label in 2019: Nightqueen from Belgium and, for the first time, a band from Australia - Envenomed. In the summer of 2019, another old friend came with the Austrians Garagedays and the Sons Of Sounds from the Karlsruhe area: David Reece returned to El Puerto Records after a short interlude to continue his solo career there, as well as the Danish / US combo Maryann Cotton. Also from Denmark: Phonomics. But expansion continued in 2020 as well. Welicoruss from Siberia joined them, followed by two German metal bands (Scorged - Saarland, Red To Grey - Bavaria). With Last Days Of Eden (Symphonic Metal) and Dieversity (Melodic Death Metal) the label showed its versatility in the following years. In 2022, the decision was made to improve the digital positioning of the label. The decision was made to switch to Edel Music and Kontor New Media (digital), which enabled further renowned bands such as Dawn of Destiny, Crossplane and Dezperadoz.

Bands
 Alight (IT)
 Beasto Blanco (US)
 Blind The Eye (PT)
 Bloodlost (CH)
 Crossplane (DE)
 Dark Blue Inc. (DE, SE, DK)
 Dawn_of_Destiny (DE)
 Dezperadoz (DE)
 Dieversity (DE)
 Dispyria (DE)
 Dust & Bones (DE)
 Dying Phoenix (DE)
 Envenomed (AU)
 Garagedays (AT)
 Generation Steel (DE)
 Ginger Red (DE)
 Last Days of Eden (ES)
 Maryann Cotton (US/DK)
 Mean Streak (SE)
 Mission in Black (DE)
 Necronomicon (DE)
 Nightqueen (BE)
 Pendulum Of Fortune (DE)
 Phonomik (DK)
 Red To Grey (DE)
 Reece (US)
 Sainted Sinners (US, DE, HU)
 Scorged (DE)
 Sons of Sounds (DE)
 Souldrinker (DE)
 Stepfather Fred (DE)
 Stormage (DE)
 The Phans (DE)
 Undertow (DE)
 Vansih (DE)
 Welicoruss (RU)
 Witchbound (DE)

External links 

 El Puerto Records Webseite
 El Puerto Records on Facebook
 Youtube-Kanal
 Instagram
 Twitter

References

German record labels
Record labels established in 2014
German companies established in 2014